Winter Truce (and Homes Blaze) is an album led by composer, multi-instrumentalist and band leader Django Bates which was recorded in 1995 and released on the JMT label.

Reception

AllMusic awarded the album 3 stars. On AllAboutJazz Chris May stated "The unfettered idiosyncrasy of the album—overflowing with new ideas and previously uncharted vistas—sums up much, and the parts themselves continue to make for enthralling listening".

Track listing
All compositions by Django Bates
 "You Can't Have Everything" – 7:46 	
 "The Loneliness of Being Right" – 7:00 	
 "...and a Golden Pear" – 8:11 	
 "New York, New York" (Fred Ebb, John Kander) – 4:56 	
 "Early Bloomer" – 2:13 	
 "X = Thingys X 3 ÷ MF" – 4:33 	
 "Fox Across the Road" – 12:01
 "Powder Room Collapse" – 6:10 	
 "Kookaburra Laughed" – 6:32 	
 "You Can't Have Everything (Reprise)" – 7:11

Personnel
Django Bates – piano, keyboards
Eddie Parker – flute, bass flute
Iain Ballamy – soprano saxophone, alto saxophone, tenor saxophone
Steve Buckley – soprano saxophone, alto saxophone, tin whistle
Mark Lockheart – tenor saxophone, clarinet
Barak Schmool – tenor saxophone, piccolo
Julian Argüelles – soprano saxophone, baritone saxophone
Sid Gauld, Chris Batchelor – trumpet
David Laurence – French horn
Roland Bates – trombone
Richard Henry – bass trombone
Sarah Waterhouse – tuba
Mike Mondesir – electric bass
Stuart Hall – guitar, violin, banjo
Martin France – drums, percussion
Christine Tobin – vocals

References 

1995 albums
Django Bates albums
JMT Records albums
Winter & Winter Records albums